Archibald Robinson Hoxton (June 28, 1875 – October 14, 1951) was an American football player, coach, and educator. He served as the head football coach at the University of Virginia from 1899 to 1900, compiling a record of 11–5–3. Hoxton played college football at Virginia from 1895 to 1896.

Head coaching record

References

External links
 

1875 births
1951 deaths
19th-century players of American football
American football quarterbacks
Virginia Cavaliers football coaches
Virginia Cavaliers football players
Sportspeople from Alexandria, Virginia
Players of American football from Virginia